Davor Palevski (born 26 February 1997) is a Macedonian handball player who plays for RK Tineks Prolet.

He participated at the 2017 Men's Junior World Handball Championship.

References

http://www.eurohandball.com/ec/cl/men/2015-16/player/557067/DavorPalevski
https://web.archive.org/web/20170122080038/http://sportmedia.mk/rakomet/domashna-liga/metalurg-se-podnovi-palevski-i-velkovski-stanaa-seniori

1997 births
Living people
Macedonian male handball players
Sportspeople from Skopje